Dimitri Othello Nance (born February 18, 1988) is a former American football running back. He was signed by the Atlanta Falcons as an undrafted free agent in 2010. He played college football at Arizona State and also played high school football at Trinity High School in Euless, Texas.

Nance has also been a member of the Green Bay Packers who he won Super Bowl XLV with, beating the Pittsburgh Steelers.

Professional career
Nance was signed as an undrafted rookie free agent by the Falcons on April 26, 2010. He was then cut and signed to the practice squad on September 5.

On September 14, 2010, Nance was signed by the Packers. He was cut on September 3, 2011.

References

External links
 Green Bay Packers bio
 Arizona State Sun Devils bio

1988 births
Living people
American football running backs
Arizona State Sun Devils football players
Atlanta Falcons players
Green Bay Packers players
People from Euless, Texas
Players of American football from Texas